Lake Buffalo is a lake in the U.S. state of South Dakota. The elevation of the lake is 2316 feet.

References

Buffalo
Bodies of water of Ziebach County, South Dakota